Korey Veeder (born October 3, 1991 in St. Petersburg, Florida) is an American former soccer player who is currently without a club.

Career

Youth
Veeder attended Dixie Hollins High School in St. Petersburg, Florida, and played club soccer with the Clearwater Chargers Soccer Club in Clearwater, Florida from 2005 to 2008. He was named to the NSCAA/ADIDAS All-American Team in 2007 and 2008.

Professional
Veeder signed his first professional contract in 2010 when he was signed by Crystal Palace Baltimore of the USSF Division 2 Professional League. He made his professional debut on May 1, 2010 in a game against Rochester Rhinos, and went on to make 20 appearances for the Eagles over the course of the season.

On February 11, 2011, Veeder signed a contract with MLS and took part in a weighed lottery four days later.  On that day, the lottery sent Veeder to the Columbus Crew who had a 19.31% chance of landing him.  Other clubs participating were Toronto FC who had a 45.52% chance of landing him, Seattle Sounders FC with a 24.83% chance and the Colorado Rapids who had a 10.34% chance.

Veeder was waived by Columbus on June 27, 2012.

International
Veeder was a member of the elite US U-17 National Team residency program in Bradenton, Florida from 2007 to 2008, representing his country on 21 occasions. He was called up to the US U-20 team in September 2010 for a tournament in Peru.

Career statistics
(correct as of 2 October 2010)

References

External links
 US Soccer player profile
 US Soccer Players interview

1987 births
Living people
American soccer players
Crystal Palace Baltimore players
Columbus Crew players
New York Cosmos (2010) players
USSF Division 2 Professional League players
North American Soccer League players
Soccer players from St. Petersburg, Florida
United States men's youth international soccer players
United States men's under-20 international soccer players
Association football defenders
Dixie Hollins High School alumni